Myocyte-specific enhancer factor 2A is a protein that in humans is encoded by the MEF2A gene.  MEF2A is a transcription factor in the Mef2 family.  In humans it is located on chromosome 15q26.  Certain mutations in MEF2A cause an autosomal dominant form of coronary artery disease and myocardial infarction.

Function 

The process of differentiation from mesodermal precursor cells to myoblasts has led to the discovery of a variety of tissue-specific factors that regulate muscle gene expression. The myogenic basic helix-loop-helix proteins, including myoD (MIM 159970), myogenin (MIM 159980), MYF5 (MIM 159990), and MRF4 (MIM 159991) are 1 class of identified factors. A second family of DNA binding regulatory proteins is the myocyte-specific enhancer factor-2 (MEF2) family. Each of these proteins binds to the MEF2 target DNA sequence present in the regulatory regions of many, if not all, muscle-specific genes. The MEF2 genes are members of the MADS gene family (named for the yeast mating type-specific transcription factor MCM1, the plant homeotic genes 'agamous' and 'deficiens' and the human serum response factor SRF (MIM 600589)), a family that also includes several homeotic genes and other transcription factors, all of which share a conserved DNA-binding domain.[supplied by OMIM]

Interactions 
Myocyte-specific enhancer factor 2A has been shown to interact with:

 ASCL1, 
 EP300, 
 HDAC4, 
 HDAC9, 
 Histone deacetylase 5, 
 MAPK14, 
 MEF2D, 
 Mothers against decapentaplegic homolog 2, and
 Thyroid hormone receptor alpha and

References

Further reading

External links 
 

Transcription factors
Human proteins